The 1964 Boston University Terriers football team was an American football team that represented Boston University as an independent during the 1964 NCAA University Division football season. In its first season under head coach Warren Schmakel, the team compiled a 2–7 record and was outscored by a total of 213 to 77.

Schedule

References

Boston University
Boston University Terriers football seasons
Boston University Terriers football